The Bedford Estate is an estate in central London owned by the Russell family, which holds the peerage title of Duke of Bedford. The estate was originally based in Covent Garden, then stretched to include Bloomsbury in 1669. The Covent Garden property was sold for £2 million in 1913 by Herbrand Russell, 11th Duke of Bedford, to the MP and land speculator Harry Mallaby-Deeley, who sold his option to the Beecham family for £250,000; the sale was finalised in 1918.

History 
In 1669, the Bloomsbury Estate came into ownership of the Russell family when William, son of William Russell, 1st Duke and 5th Earl of Bedford (1616–1700), married Lady Rachel Vaughan, one of the daughters of Thomas Wriothesley, 4th Earl of Southampton (1607–1667). She had recently inherited the agricultural fields now known as Bloomsbury from her father.

Francis Russell, 5th Duke of Bedford (1765–1802) came of age in 1786.  He was a spendthrift gambler, with an interest in farming on the Woburn estate. However, he was not interested in Bedford House in Bloomsbury, instead living in the West End. In 1800, the contents of Bedford House were put up for auction and the house was demolished. It was replaced by a wide avenue, Bedford Place, leading north to the large Russell Square, with Montague Street running parallel to the west. Francis Russell commissioned James Burton, the pre-eminent property developer of Georgian London, to develop the land into a residential area in which Russell Square would be the focal point, and which would be landscaped by Humphrey Repton, who had impressed Francis Russell with his work on the Woburn estate.

The development of Bloomsbury was continued by Francis Russell's brother, John Russell, 6th Duke of Bedford (1766–1839). The firm of Thomas Cubitt (1788–1855) were involved towards the end of the development. Eventually, the entire estate north of Russell Square was filled with squares and houses.  John Russell was also responsible for the building of the Covent Garden Market to the south of the main estate.

Herbrand Russell, 11th Duke of Bedford (1858–1940) succeeded to the title in 1893. By then, there was a move against the owners of large estates.  Herbrand Russell began to sell off the estates under his control.  The sale contract for Covent Garden was signed in 1914 and finalised with Sir Thomas Beecham (1879–1961) in 1918.

The Bedford Estates 
The British Museum and the University of London replaced large parts of the estate and the remnants are owned by The Bedford Estates, mainly residential property that has been converted for office and hotel use, together with private residential property. The company is the largest private landowner in Bloomsbury and is managed from the Bedford Office in Montague Street, within the estate.

Geography 
The main Bedford Estate originally extended between Tottenham Court Road, Euston Road, Southampton Row, and New Oxford Street. There were also two separate parts on the other side of Tottenham Court Road and Euston Road. To the south, the Covent Garden Estate north of the Strand was also part of the Bedford Estate.

Garden squares in the main Bedford Estate include:

 Bedford Square
 Bloomsbury Square
 Gordon Square
 Russell Square
 Tavistock Square
 Torrington Square
 Woburn Square

In the northern separate part of the Bedford Estate is Harrington Square.  The neighbouring Ampthill Square Estate is built on what was previously another garden square, Ampthill Square.

See also 
 Covent Garden Estate
Other large privately owned historic estates in London include:
Cadogan Estates
Portman Estate
Grosvenor Estate
Howard de Walden Estate
Langham Estate
Smith's Charity Estate (South Kensington, SW7)
Pettiward Estate (West Brompton, SW10)
Peabody Trust (1862, charity)
Ilchester Estate, Kensington (see Holland House)
Naru Estate

References

External links 

 The Bedford Estates website
 

 
Districts of the London Borough of Camden
History of the London Borough of Camden

Covent Garden
Privately owned estates in London